Elias Víctor Hartard Ojeda (born 18 May 1987) is a Chilean footballer who plays for Deportes Temuco.

Honours

Player
Santiago Wanderers
 Primera B de Chile (1): 2019

External links
 EliasHartard.com
 
 

1987 births
Living people
Spanish people of Chilean descent
Chilean footballers
Deportes La Serena footballers
San Marcos de Arica footballers
Santiago Morning footballers
Chilean Primera División players
Primera B de Chile players
Segunda División Profesional de Chile players
San Luis F.C. players
Santiago Wanderers footballers
Deportes Iberia footballers
Deportes Temuco footballers
Association football goalkeepers
Footballers from Madrid